Edward Potter may refer to:

 Edward Clark Potter (1857–1923), American sculptor
 Edward Tuckerman Potter (1831–1904), American architect
 Edward E. Potter (1823–1889), Union general in the American Civil War
 Edward Potter (footballer) (1878–1960), Australian rules footballer